Juan de Carvajal was a Spanish conquistador and one of the first governors of Venezuela Province.

Carvajal was born in Spain in 1509. He was in Venezuela in the 1540s, a time when territory there had been assigned to the Welser family by the Emperor Charles V. When Philipp von Hutten and Bartholomeus VI. Welser were on a expedition to find the mythical El Dorado, Carvajal tried to take control, and in 1545 he founded the settlement of El Tocuyo which became the colonists' administrative capital.
Von Hutten and Welser returned from the failed expedition in 1546, a dispute broke out and Carvajal had them killed. The Spanish authorities sentenced Carvajal to death and also withdrew the Welser family's colonial rights, which ended Klein-Venedig.

References

 Carvaj
Spanish conquistadors
Royal Governors of Venezuela
1509 births
1546 deaths